When the Feeling Hits You! is a 1965 studio album by Sammy Davis Jr., featuring Sam Butera and the Witnesses.

Background
The album was released on the Reprise label, catalogue number RS 6144.

Track listing
"When the Feeling Hits You" (Doyle) – 2:57
"Don't Cry, Joe (Let Her Go, Let Her Go, Let Her Go)" (Joe Marsala) – 2:51
"There Will Never Be Another You" (Mack Gordon, Harry Warren) – 2:08
"April in Paris" (Vernon Duke, Yip Harburg) – 2:47
"L' Amour, Toujours l'Amour" (Roger Casini, Rudolf Friml, Chisholm Cushing) – 1:57
"I Should Care" (Sammy Cahn, Axel Stordahl, Paul Weston) – 2:57
"Cry Me a River" (Arthur Hamilton) – 3:13
"Do Nothing till You Hear from Me" (Duke Ellington, Bob Russell) – 3:01
"These Foolish Things (Remind Me of You)" (Harry Link, Holt Marvell, Jack Strachey) – 3:59
"This Is Always" (Gordon, Warren) – 3:42

Personnel 
Sammy Davis Jr. - vocals
Sam Butera and the Witnesses: Sam Butera - Tenor sax/arrangerLou Scioneaux - TromboneMorgan Thomas - TrumpetBobby Rosario - PianoRolando "Rolly Dee" DiIorio - BassJimmy Vincent - Drums

References

1965 albums
Sammy Davis Jr. albums
Reprise Records albums
Vocal jazz albums